Aspen Community Foundation is a community foundation that serves the Roaring Fork and Colorado River Valleys of Western Colorado.  Founded by the Aspen Skiing Company in 1980 to promote philanthropy in the community, the Aspen Foundation, as it was originally named, raised funds by distributing ski passes to donors: a similar tradition that exists to this day. The introduction of Donor Advised Funds in 2000 further guided the Community Foundation towards fiscal and administrative self-reliance.  Aspen Community Foundation currently holds about 150 different types of funds and annually distributes about $5 million in grants through its donor advised, scholarships, organization and unrestricted grantmaking funds.

External links
 Aspen Community Foundation - official site

Community foundations based in the United States
Non-profit organizations based in Colorado